Mary or Maria the Jewess, also known as Mary the Prophetess or Maria the Copt, was an early alchemist known from the works of Zosimos of Panopolis and other authors in the Greek alchemical tradition. On the basis of Zosimos's comments, she lived between the first and third centuries A.D. in Alexandria. French, Taylor and Lippmann list her as one of the first alchemical writers, dating her works at no later than the first century.

She is credited with the invention of several kinds of chemical apparatus and is considered to be the first true alchemist of the Western world.

Through Zosimos many of the beliefs of Mary the Jewess can be observed. Mary incorporated lifelike attributes into her descriptions of metal such as bodies, souls, and spirits. Mary believed that metals had two different genders and by joining these two genders together a new entity could be made. By joining the different gendered substances together a unity of substances could be obtained.

History 
The primary source for the existence of "Mary the Jewess" within the context of alchemy is Zosimos of Panopolis, who wrote, in the 4th century, the oldest extant books on alchemy. Zosimos described several of Mary's experiments and instruments. In his writings, Mary is almost always mentioned as having lived in the past, and she is described as "one of the sages".

George Syncellus, a Byzantine chronicler of the 8th century, presented Mary as a teacher of Democritus, whom she had met in Memphis, Egypt, during the time of Pericles.

The 10th century Kitāb al-Fihrist of Ibn al-Nadim cited Mary as one of the 52 most famous alchemists and stated that she was able to prepare caput mortuum, a purple pigment.

The early medieval alchemical text ascribed to an otherwise unknown "Morienus Romanus" called her "Mary the Prophetess", and the Arabs knew her as the "Daughter of Plato" – a name which, in Western alchemical texts, was reserved for white sulfur.

Arabic and Latin works 
Of Mary's Greek works only fragments survive as quoted by Zosimos of Panopolis, pseudo-Olympiodorus and other later authors. However, several Arabic writings attributed to her are extant, some of them also in Latin translations:
 "The Book of Maria and the Wise Men"
 "The Epistle of the Crown and the Creation of the Newborn Baby"

Alchemical philosophy

Axiom of Maria 

The following was known as the Axiom of Maria:

Marie-Louise von Franz, an associate of psychologist Carl Jung, gives an alternative version:

Carl Jung used this axiom as a metaphor for wholeness and individuation.

Other 
Several cryptic alchemical precepts have been attributed to Mary. She is said to have spoken of the union of opposites:

Inventions 

Mary, along with Agathodaemon, Pseudo-Democritus, and Hermes Trismegistus, was mentioned by Zosimos of Panopolis in his descriptions of  certain devices, such as the tribikos, the kerotakis, and the bain-marie. But her contributions are disputed and not clear.

Tribikos 
The tribikos was a kind of alembic with three arms that was used to obtain substances purified by distillation. It is not known whether Mary invented it, but Zosimos credits the first description of the instrument to her. It is still used today in chemistry labs. In her writings (quoted by Zosimos), Mary recommends that the copper or bronze used to make the tubes should be the thickness of a frying pan and that the joints between the tubes and the still-head should be sealed with flour paste.

Kerotakis 

The kerotakis ( or κυροτακίς), is a device used to heat substances used in alchemy and to collect vapors. It is an airtight container with a sheet of copper upon its upper side. When working properly, all its joints form a tight vacuum. The use of such sealed containers in the hermetic arts led to the term "hermetically sealed". The kerotakis was said to be a replication of the process of the formation of gold that was occurring in the bowels of the earth.

This instrument was later modified by the German chemist Franz von Soxhlet in 1879 to create the extractor that bears his name, the Soxhlet extractor.

Bain-marie 
Mary's name survives in her invention of the bain-marie (Mary's bath), which limits the maximum temperature of a container and its contents to the boiling point of a separate liquid: essentially a double boiler. It is extensively used in chemical processes for which a gentle heat is necessary. This term was introduced by Arnold of Villanova in the 14th century. The bain-marie is also used for cooking food.

See also 
 Alchemy
 Cleopatra the Alchemist (Egypt)
 Timeline of women in science

References

Bibliography 
  (Paperback edition)

External links 
 
 Mary the Prophetess: The Dialogue of Mary and Aros on the Magistery of Hermes.

3rd-century women
Ancient alchemists
Ancient Jewish scholars
Ancient Jewish women
Ancient women scientists
Greek alchemists
Hellenistic Jews
Jewish chemists
Jewish women writers
Women chemists
Women inventors
Year of birth unknown
Year of death unknown